Tharangambadi taluk is a taluk of Mayiladuthurai district of the Indian state of Tamil Nadu. The headquarters of the taluk is the town of Porayar

Demographics
According to the 2011 census, the taluk of Tharangambadi had a population of 206,752 with 101,537  males and 105,215 females. There were 1036 women for every 1000 men. The taluk had a literacy rate of 76. Child population in the age group below 6 was 10,367 Males and 9,902 Females.

References 

Taluks of Mayiladuthurai district